Below is list of German language exonyms for places in Denmark. This article does not include spelling changes with the same rough pronunciation, names spelled alike, and the predictable sending changes shown below:

-ager -bjerg -bøl -borg -havn -lev -sted -ved → -agger -berg -büll -burg -hagen -leff -stedt -vedt

List of names

See also

German exonyms
List of European exonyms

Denmark
German
Exonyms